Piotr Michałowski (July 2, 1800 – June 9, 1855) was a Polish painter of the Romantic period, especially known for his many portraits, and oil studies of horses. Broadly educated, he was also a social activist, legal advocate, city administrator and President of the Kraków Agricultural Society (since 1853). The Sukiennice Museum, a division of the National Museum in Kraków, contains a room that is named after him and devoted to Michałowski's work.

Career

Michałowski was born at an estate in Krzysztoforzyce outside Kraków, the son of landowner Józef Michałowski, senator in the Free City of Kraków. His artistic talent developed at an early age of 13 under the watchful eye of several artists including Michał Stachowicz, Józef Brodowski (1817) and Franciszek Lampi. He formally studied a broad range of subjects at the Jagiellonian University including classical philosophy, agriculture and mathematics.

During the November Uprising against the Russian rulership, Michałowski helped run a Polish munition factory. To avoid capture, he escaped to Paris, France with his new wife Julia Ostrowska and her father. While in Paris, he continued his studies of painting and anatomy with Nicolas Toussaint Charlet (1832–1835), greatly influenced by the art of Théodore Géricault, Rembrandt and Velázquez. His watercolour studies of horses became very popular in France, sold by local art dealers since 1833 to English, German and American collectors.

Michałowski returned to Kraków in 1835 and in 1837 settled into his family estate in Krzysztoforzyce. In the 1840s and 1850s he produced numerous equestrian paintings and dramatic landscapes including his famous Romantic "Battle of Somosierra" (1844–1855, several versions), "Parade before Napoleon" and other battle sites. When Pablo Picasso visited Poland in 1948, he saw Michałowski's work at the Warsaw National Museum and shouted, "Here, painter!"

See also
 Polish Romantic Jan Nepomucen Głowacki, the father of Polish school of landscape painting

References

 Maciej Masłowski: Piotr Michałowski, Warsaw 1957, ed. „Sztuka”;
 Maciej Masłowski: Piotr Michałowski, Warsaw 1974, ed. „Arkady” (in series „W kręgu sztuki” - "In the Circle of Art", also German version: Berlin 1974, ed. Henschel Verlag und Gess.);
 Jerzy Sienkiewicz: Piotr Michałowski, Warsaw 1959, ed. "Auriga - Wydawnictwa Artystyczne i Filmowe" (Art and Film Publisher).
Selection of works including bio at Artyzm.com
 Piotr Michalowski at Cracow Life.com (in English)
 Somosierra - Piotr Michałowski at Culture.pl

1800 births
1855 deaths
Burials at Rakowicki Cemetery
19th-century Polish painters
19th-century Polish male artists
Equine artists
Polish male painters